Hugo Hansen (born 1 August 1967) is a Norwegian former international footballer, who played for Bryne, Molde and Rosenborg during his professional career. Hansen won the Norwegian Cup with Bryne in 1987, and was capped 14 times for Norway. He is the father of Cato Hansen and Hege Hansen.

References

1967 births
Living people
People from Vega, Norway
Sportspeople from Nordland
Norwegian footballers
Association football defenders
Norway international footballers
Eliteserien players
Bryne FK players
Molde FK players
Rosenborg BK players